Jo Dong-gi (born 18 December 1937) is a South Korean boxer. He competed in the men's flyweight event at the 1964 Summer Olympics.

References

1937 births
Living people
South Korean male boxers
Olympic boxers of South Korea
Boxers at the 1964 Summer Olympics
Place of birth missing (living people)
Flyweight boxers